= Demokratia (1925) =

Albanian newspaper

- Publisher: Xhevat Kallajxhiu
- Founded: 1925
- Ceased publication: 1939
- Political alignment: Independent
- Language: Albanian language
- Headquarters: Gjirokastër
- Country: Albania

Demokratia ('Democracy') was a weekly newspaper published from Gjirokastër, Albania, 1925–1939. Demokratia was published and edited by Xhevat Kallajxhiu. He founded the newspaper in 1925. Politically, the newspaper had an independent editorial line. It became widely read.

In December 1928 Demokratia became the platform for Branko Merxhani and Vangjel Koça to promote Neo-Albanianism.
